Kirkwall in Orkney was a royal burgh that returned one commissioner to the Parliament of Scotland and to the Convention of Estates.

After the Acts of Union 1707, Kirkwall, Dingwall, Dornoch, Tain and Wick formed the Tain district of burghs, returning one member between them to the House of Commons of Great Britain.

List of burgh commissioners

 1669–74: James Moncreiff, merchant-burgess 
 1681–82, 1685–86: David Craigie of Over-Sanday 
 1689 convention, 1690–?93: George Traill of Quendel 
 1698–1702: Sir Alexander Home  
 1702–07: Robert Douglas

See also
 List of constituencies in the Parliament of Scotland at the time of the Union

References

Constituencies of the Parliament of Scotland (to 1707)
Constituencies disestablished in 1707
1707 disestablishments in Scotland
Politics of Orkney
History of Orkney
Kirkwall